Burro is a Spanish and Portuguese word for 'donkey', and an Italian word for 'butter'. It may refer to:
 Donkeys including:
 Feral North American donkeys in the western United States
 the Burro da Ilha Graciosa of the Azores, Portugal
 the Burro de Miranda of Portugal
 the Burro Mexicano or Mexican Burro
 Burro (card game), a card game
 Burro (film), 1989 Italian film
 Burro Island, island of Venezuela
 El Burro wetland in Bogotà
 "Burro," a song by Beck